Killington is a civil parish in the South Lakeland District of Cumbria, England.  It contains 20 listed buildings that are recorded in the National Heritage List for England.  Of these, two are listed at Grade II*, the middle of the three grades, and the others are at Grade II, the lowest grade.  The parish contains the village of Killington and the settlement of Hallbeck, and is otherwise completely rural.  Most of the listed buildings are houses, farmhouses, and farm buildings, the others being bridges, a church, and a milestone.


Key

Buildings

Notes and references

Notes

Citations

Sources

Lists of listed buildings in Cumbria